Deliriosa is a genus of spiders in the family Lycosidae. It was first described in 2009 by Kovblyuk. , it contains only one species, Deliriosa chiragrica, found in Ukraine.

References

Lycosidae
Monotypic Araneomorphae genera